Barbaza, officially the Municipality of Barbaza, is a 4th class municipality in the province of Antique, Philippines. According to the 2020 census, it has a population of 23,359 people.

Major sources of income of the people are derived from agriculture, fishing, trade and commerce, employment and remittances from abroad. About 94% of the total population have access to potable water. Five health centers serve 39 barangays. There is a 10-bed capacity government hospital staffed by 27 health personnel.

History
Long after the discovery of the Philippines by the Spaniards led by Ferdinand Magellan on March 16, 1521, there was already an established settlement in a place presumably now Barangay Esparar. In later years however, the Moros from Palawan and Mindoro started coming to raid and plunder the inhabitants, and often abducted beautiful maidens and men to be made slaves. Because of fear, the inhabitants moved to a much safer place, in a narrow strip of land at the foot of Mount Dumangsal. The site of the new settlement up to this day is called Igtara. The population rapidly increased. When the Moros stopped coming, they decided to move down to a much wider plain. The settlement started to flourish and later a church and a town hall were built out of bamboo and cogon grass. Today, it is where Barangay Binanu-an stands. Binanu-an means "Ginbanwahan or Binanwahan".

The formation of a formal government which was headed either by a Teniente or a captain, started at Binanu-an. The settlement in Binanu-an lasted so long until sometime in the 17th century when the inhabitants, again, found a much better place to live in because it is nearer to the sea which yields fish in abundance. They decided to transfer from Binanu-an to the seashore by the bank of the once deep river called Nalupa. The new settlement was named Nalupa Nuevo. Permanent structures like a church and a Municipal Hall were built.

Unfortunately, sometime in the 18th century the settlement suffered another drawback. Dalanas River, one of the bigger rivers in Antique, used to overflow during heavy rains causing destruction to properties and lives of people living near the area. Alarmed by the situation affecting the settlement at Nalupa Nuevo, the Spanish Governor Enrique Barboza ordered to transfer the people to another site called Otngol which was at that time, part of what is now the town of Laua-an.

During the transfer of the settlement from Nalupa to Otngol the Municipal Government was already run by a Capitan. The first Capitan was ('Tan) Julian Flores. He was later succeeded by ('Tan) Roman Francisco, then by Capitan Justiniano Ogatis-Barrientos. It was during his administration sometime in 1886 when he worked out for the separation of the town from the Municipality of Laua-an. The town's name was changed to Barboza in honor of Spanish Governor Enrique Barboza of Antique. The spelling was later changed to Barbaza because of the difficulty in pronouncing the former name. To this day the town is officially named the Municipality of Barbaza.

Geography
According to the Philippine Statistics Authority, the municipality has a land area of  constituting  of the  total area of Antique.
Barbaza has a total coastline of  along the Sulu Sea. 

Mount Nangtud is the second highest mountain in Panay Island located in the south west of Jamindan bordered in the North East of Barbaza , with an elevation of 6,804 feet (2,074 meters) above sea level. It is the second highest peak of Central Panay Mountain Range the longest and the largest mountain range in Western Visayas.

Climate

Barangays
Barbaza is politically subdivided into 39 barangays. It is composed of 22 upland and 17 lowland barangays where upland area accounts for 88.43% of the total land area.

Demographics

In the 2020 census, Barbaza had a population of 23,359.

Economy

Tourism
Mount Nangtud is rich for its diverse flora and fauna and a Mossy forest. It is one of the most difficult and technically challenging mountain in Panay. Alongside with Mount Madja-as in Culasi and Mount Baloy in Valderrama.
 Batabat and Punta Coral Reefs – feature diversities of tropical fishes and distinct coral formations in vibrant colors
Its provides large amount supplies of water for Agricultural land area in Barbaza lowland.
 Camp Eupre Forest and Orchard Resort - Located in Bgy. Cadiao
 Macalbag Waterfalls – 50-foot waterfalls with uncharted caves
 Cadiao Falls - Located in Bgy. Cadiao 
 Sigbungon Falls - Located in Bgy. San Ramon
 Sayay Falls - Located in Bgy. San Ramon
 Barbaza Catholic Church – considered as the most modernly designed church in the province of Antique

Festivals
Barbaza celebrates the annual Batabat Festival, held every 3rd week of March. The feast of Saint Anthony of Padua is celebrated every 13 June.

Transportation 
Transportation services are generally provided by tricycles, jeepneys, vans and buses. There are also daily buses available going back and forth to Manila that pass by Barbaza via the roll-on/roll-off nautical highway. Other bridges are the Binangbang Bridge and Ipil Bridge.

References

External links
 [ Philippine Standard Geographic Code]

Municipalities of Antique (province)